Heinz Steinschulte (born 28 April 1909, date of death unknown) was a German basketball player. He competed in the men's tournament at the 1936 Summer Olympics.

References

External links
 

1909 births
Year of death missing
German men's basketball players
Olympic basketball players of Germany
Basketball players at the 1936 Summer Olympics
Place of birth missing